McElderry is a surname. McElderry was originally spelled Macelderry. Mac means son in Gaelic. Some families also dropped an r, such as McEldery.

Notable people with the surname include:

Jim McElderry, American soccer player and coach
Joe McElderry (born 1991), English singer-songwriter

See also
McElderry Park, Baltimore